Varatuomari (lit. 'vice-judge' or 'reserve judge'; Swedish: vicehäradshövding), or Master of Laws with court training, is a Finnish legal title for a qualified lawyer who has been trained on the bench and is equipped to appear before a court.

The title is granted by the Judicial Training Board, following the completion of a Master's degree in law and a one-year court training period as a Trainee District Judge in a District Court, or partially in an Administrative Court or a Court of Appeals. The Board also carries out the centralised application procedure for court traineeships and selects and appoints Trainees to District Courts, Administrative Courts and Courts of Appeal, and grants the candidates who successfully complete the court traineeship the right to use this qualification.

The title is not a formal requirement for public sector legal offices, but it remains a de facto requirement when applying for the positions of e.g. judge or prosecutor. In addition, it is recognised as a relevant qualification for appointments into senior police officer positions.

See also
Barrister

References

Law of Finland
Master's degrees
Professional certification in law